Schefflera vitiensis is a species of plant in the family Araliaceae. It is endemic to Fiji.

References

Endemic flora of Fiji
vitiensis
Least concern plants
Taxonomy articles created by Polbot